Lingambudhi Park is a park in the city of Mysore, India.

Location
Lingambudhi Park is located on the northern and eastern sides of the Lingambudhi Lake.  The north gate of the park is located at Ramakrishna Nagar and the southern gate is located at Preethy Layout, Srirampur.

History
Lingambudhi stands first in terms of richness entirely due to its location bordering growing city.
Lingambudhi lake is a perennial freshwater lake situated in the basin of River Cauvery. Since its construction in 1828 until the late 1980s, Lingambudhi lake was a typical village lake in the rural surroundings of the city of Mysore. Now this lake is close to a residential area called Srirampura. The lake was serving as a source of drinking water, irrigation, and fish produce; as a site for washing clothes and cattle; and as a place of religious worship for the people of Lingambudhi Palya, a village in the vicinity of the lake.
A notification from the DCs office dated 28 August 2003, in response to the Forest Department’s proposal of 2001, had finally declared the Lingambudhi lake and its environs as a protected forest area and had transferred the ownership to the Forest Department.  This was one of the significant milestones in the history of Lingambudhi lake which now enjoys the status of a protected forest. (Manjunath Sadashiva, 2007)

See also
 Ramakrishna Nagar
 Kuvempu Nagar
 Srirampur
 Lingam Budhi Lake

Image gallery

References

Mysore South